The Clase Tiburón submarines (in English Shark-class), was a mini submarines class of the Spanish Navy built in 1964. Only two units were built. Currently, Tiburón-I (SA-51) is conserved as a museum ship in Barcelona and Tiburón-II (SA-52) in Cartagena.

Design
With a crew of five men, Tiburon-class submarines were intended to carry out week-long missions, would be ideal for operating in shallow waters and carrying special forces behind the enemy lines. They were equipped with a greater accommodation than the preceding Foca-class, with a bathroom and two bunk beds, which allowed the crew to rest in "hot bed" shifts.

The design was based upon the German minisubmarine Hai-class. The submarines had two diesel engines (115 HP) and two electric engines (110 HP). The armament was two torpedoes. The sail was larger than the previous class which helps in the surveillance tasks. The submarines were armed with two 533 mm tubes capable of carrying G7a or G7e torpedoes.

History and current status

The Tiburón-class had only two units, SA-51 and SA-52, but despite an improved version of the previous class, never got to join the navy. The submarines were in the Naval Week of Barcelona in 1966, one of them, SA-52, arrive from Cartagena on her own.

On May 9, 1986, the SA-51 submarine was donated to the La Caixa Foundation for its science museum, now called "CosmoCaixa". The submarine is on display in front of the museum entrance.

The SA-52 remains on display at the  Isaac Peral Naval Base in Cartagena.

See also
 Spanish Navy
 List of submarines of the Spanish Navy
 List of retired Spanish Navy ships

References

Sources
 

Ships built in Cartagena, Spain
Submarines of the Spanish Navy
1964 ships
Midget submarines
Museum ships in Spain